was a Japanese mystery writer and fantasy novelist. Despite his early death aged 27, he was an inspiration for later Japanese authors.

Biography
Watanabe was born in Yakomura, Kamiiso District, Hokkaido (now Hokuto City). His real name was Yutaka Watanabe. He was the third son of Itaro Watanabe and Tsune Watanabe, and the younger brother of detective writer Keisuke Watanabe. In February 1905, the family moved to Fukagawa, Tokyo, and he spent his childhood in company housing in a slum area. In August 1912, he moved to Takasuzu Village, Taga District in Ibaraki Prefecture (now Hitachi City). In 1920, he graduated from Mito Junior High School and entered Keio University's Literature Preparatory Course, but dropped out in April 1921. In April 1922, he entered Keio High School. Around this time, he started living with his brother Keisuke and the writer Kōtarō Fukuda.

In 1924, he submitted "Shadows" to a competition for film drafts held by the Plato Publishing magazines Josei and Kuraku and won the first prize. The judges on this occasion were Jun'ichirō Tanizaki and Kaoru Osanai. Around this time, he became acquainted with Michiko Oikawa, an actress at the Tsukiji Shōgekijō (Tsukiji Little Theatre), and started a romantic relationship, but because Oikawa was sickly the people around him opposed marriage and he gave up on it.

In March 1926, he graduated from Keio High School. In January 1927 he was recruited by Masashi Yokomizo, who had been appointed as the second editor-in-chief of Shin Seinen (“New Youth”) magazine, and joined publisher Hakubunkan as an editorial assistant. He is said to have worn morning dress and a top hat when going to Hakubunkan’s offices, at that time a clear exhibition of his commitment to modernism.

In July 1928, he left Hakubunkan to concentrate on his own creative activities. In April 1929, together with Keisuke, he translated work by Edogawa Ranpo for the publication of The Poe, Hoffmann Collection (part of The Kozeisha Complete Works of World Popular Literature, Volume 30; both of them were in charge of Edgar Allan Poe). In addition, he recommended that Keisuke write a detective novel as potential material for the silent film star Tokihiko Okada, and this resulted in Keisuke's maiden work, Madonna with False Eyes (Shin Seinen, June issue). In November, he returned to work at the Shin Seinen editorial department.

On 9 February 1930, with translator Shigeji Narahara (Shuji Hasegawa), he visited Jun'ichirō Tanizaki, who was living in Okamoto near Kobe (now Higashinada Ward, Kobe City), to persuade him to write an essay for Shin Seinen. That night (around 1:50 a.m. on the following day, the 10th), a freight train collided with his taxi at a railroad crossing in Shukugawa. He was taken to Nishinomiya Regeneration Hospital, but died of cerebral contusion. Narahara, who was in the taxi with him, was also injured but survived.

Tanizaki published his eulogy for Watanabe entitled Shunkan in the April 1930 issue of Shin Seinen. The incident was the motivation for Tanizaki to write The Secret History of the Lord of Musashi, and it was serialized in the same magazine from 1931 onwards.

Major works
 , published simultaneously in the January 1925 issues of both Kuraku and Josei magazines. First published under the name "Yu Watanabe". Debut publication.
 , "Mita Bungeijin" July 1925 issue. First published under the name " Yutaka Watanabe". Reprinted in Shin Seinen March 1929 issue
 , reprinted in January 1927 issue of Detective Hobby, and April 1930 issue of Shin Seinen
 , Shin Seinen March 1927 issue
 , Shin Seinen April 1927 issue
 , Detective Hobby July 1927 issue
 , Shin Seinen October 1927 issue
 , Detective Hobby April 1928 issue
 , Kodan Zasshi April 1929 issue
 , Shin Seinen August 1929 issue
For more, see Descendants of Androgynous: The Complete Works of On Watanabe.

Watanabe’s works await translation into English.

References

Bibliography

Notes

See also
Japanese literature
List of Japanese writers

1902 births
1930 deaths
20th-century Japanese writers
Japanese mystery writers